Dewa United Football Club (formerly known as Martapura Football Club) is an Indonesian professional football club based in South Tangerang, Banten. They currently compete in the Liga 1, the top-flight of Indonesian football. They were promoted from Liga 2, after gaining a third place title in the 2021 Liga 2 season.

History

Martapura FC  (2009–2021) 
Martapura was founded in 2009. They became an official member of PSSI on 11 March 2009. Their first participation in Indonesian competitions was in the 2009–10 Liga Indonesia Third Division. They were promoted to the Liga Indonesia Second Division in 2011 after finishing in fifth position in the 2010–11 Liga Indonesia Third Division. Because of the dualism in PSSI at the time, they started their next season in 2012. They participated in the 2012 Liga Indonesia Second Division and got promoted to the Liga Indonesia First Division. Martapura, with mostly local players, got promoted in their first season in the highest amateur division in Indonesia after finishing second in the third round of the 2013 Liga Indonesia First Division. With their promotion, they became a professional club. They are one of team in Indonesia that have not been supported by the local government financially, even though they performed at amateur level until 2013 and are allowed to get financial support.

Since the 2014 Liga Indonesia Premier Division, they used Demang Lehman Stadium to comply with PT. Liga regulations.

Dewa United FC (2021–present) 
On 22 February 2021, Martapura officially changed ownership after being acquired by Garibaldi Thohir, Rendra Soedjono and Kevin Hardiman who subsequently rebranded the club as Martapura Dewa United F.C. and moved it to South Tangerang.

On 28 September 2021, Dewa United made their first league match debut in a 3–1 win against RANS Cilegon at the Gelora Bung Karno Madya Stadium. a weeks later, they had their second match in a 2–0 win against Perserang Serang. On 30 November 2021, they closed the match in the group stage of the 2021–22 Liga 2 in a 0–1 loss against Persekat Tegal, with this result, they qualified for the second round as winners Group B. On 23 December 2021, they qualified for the semi-finals of the 2021–22 Liga 2 as Group Y  winners after their match win 0–1 over PSMS Medan. but the unsatisfactory result occurred during the semi-final four days later, they failed to reach the final after lose 1–2 against Persis Solo, after this, they will immediately focus on the match for the third place against PSIM Yogyakarta. In the third place match on 30 December 2021, they became the third place after defeating PSIM Yogyakarta in a 0–1 victory, with a goal created in the last minute of the second half through Gufroni Al Maruf's goal, with the victory against PSIM, Dewa United won third place 2021–22 Liga 2 and promoted to Liga 1 next season.

As result of PSSI Congress on 30 May 2022, Martapura Dewa United officially remove Martapura from its name.

Honours 
Indonesia Soccer Championship B
Fourth place (1): 2016
Liga 2
Third place (1): 2021
Fourth place (1): 2017

Players

Current squad

Out on loan

Coaching staff

Supporter
Anak Dewa are the supporters of Dewa United FC.

Mascot
Unicorn is the mascot of Dewa United FC, Dewa United FC comes from South Tangerang, Banten Province. There is a mythological animal that lives in Banten Province, namely the Unicorn. Marco Polo had stopped in Indonesia, more precisely to the islands of Sumatra and Java, on his way back to Europe. He claimed to have seen a unicorn or a mythological creature in the form of a one-horned horse. However, the researchers concluded that the animal Marco Polo saw was actually a one-horned rhino. Banten province is the only one in the world where the one-horned rhino habitat still exists. Therefore, Dewa United FC made Unicorn a mascot. The philosophy of the unicorn is that the animal represents purity, healing, joy, courage, and unmatched strength. Dewa United's nickname is Deluxe Unicorn (Luxury Unicorn), because the Dewa United club has luxurious facilities that support achievements when competing in Liga 1.

Sponsorship 
 Jeep
 Gudangkripto
 Nusapay
 JHL Solitaire

Kit supplier 
   Mills

References

External links 
  
 

Dewa United F.C.
South Tangerang
Football clubs in Banten
Football clubs in Indonesia
Association football clubs established in 2009
2009 establishments in Indonesia